The 1968–69 Indiana Pacers season was Indiana's second season in the ABA and second as a team.

1968 ABA Draft

Roster

Season standings

Eastern Division

Western Division

Awards, records, and honors
 Mel Daniels won the 1969 ABA All-Star Game MVP along with the 1968-69 ABA MVP award.

ABA All-Stars
 Mel Daniels
 Bob Netolicky

Team leaders

Playoffs
Eastern Division Semifinals vs. Kentucky Colonels

Pacers win series, 4–3

Eastern Division Finals vs Miami Floridians

Pacers win series, 4–1

ABA Finals vs. Oakland Oaks

Pacers lose series 4–1

References

Indiana Pacers seasons
Indiana
Indiana Pacers
Indiana Pacers